Brando Huang (born 22 March 1981) is a Taiwanese actor and television host.

Career
Born in Huwei, Yunlin, Huang is originally an engineer at Hsinchu Science and Industrial Park, but had an interest in performing since young. Discovered by comedian Hsu Hsiao-shun, Huang started out by making numerous appearances in television shows where he is known for impersonating famous personalities such as the comedian Kang Kang and musician Wu Bai.

Huang's first acting role was in the series Your Home is My Home, and he has appeared in several films and television series since, including Monga, Monga Yao Hui, Partners in Crime and At Cafe 6. In 2015, he earned a Golden Bell Award nomination for his role in the television film Let the Sunshine In.

Filmography

Television series

Film

Variety show

Music video appearances

Awards and nominations

References

External links
 
 
 

1981 births
Living people
People from Yunlin County
21st-century Taiwanese male actors
Taiwanese male film actors
Taiwanese male television actors
Taiwanese television presenters
Taiwanese engineers
Electronics engineers